Larry Allen Vickers is a retired soldier, firearms instructor, and author. He is the founder of Vickers Tactical, and co-founder of the International Defensive Pistol Association and Firearms Training Association.

Early life 
Vickers was born in Adams Mills, Ohio in June 1963. His father served in the North African and Italian campaign of World War II.

When he was in middle school, Vickers decided that he wanted to join the United States Army Special Forces, and gained an interest in firearms during this period. Vickers entered into the Delayed Entry Program and graduated from Tri-Valley High School in 1981, and graduated from the military in 1982. He joined Delta Force in 1987.

Career 
Vickers participated in Operation Desert Storm, and Operation Acid Gambit, for which he received the Bronze Star Medal. Vickers retired from Delta Force after 20 years of service, mostly due to personal injuries. Vickers formerly worked for Heckler & Koch, during which time he helped to develop the HK416 and HK45.

Larry Vickers is the author of the "Vickers Guide", a series of reference books that launched in 2015, detailing firearms such as the Colt AR-15, M1911, and MP 40.

In 2009, the Vickers Tactical YouTube channel was created. By 2021, it reached upwards of 900,000 subscribers, and 200,000,000 views.

Personal life 
Vickers is a fan of the AK-47, and has an autograph from Mikhail Kalashnikov. In 2021, Vickers was diagnosed with cancer.

Vickers has an affinity for Rhodesia, and in 2017 posted a photo of a Rhodesian FAL with the caption  “It’s time to slot floppies. ...” (floppies being a racial slur and slot being Rhodesian slang for shoot). He believes that the fall of Rhodesia was “the greatest tragedy of the post-World War II era.”

References

External links 
 Official website

Living people
1963 births
Delta Force
Military personnel from Ohio
United States Army personnel of the Gulf War
Gun writers
Educational and science YouTubers